KDOL-LP (96.1 FM) is a radio station licensed to Livingston, Texas, United States. The station is currently owned by Lake Livingston Broadcasting.

References

External links
 

DOL-LP
DOL-LP